Carlos Antonio Salomón Tapia (born 18 February 2002) is a Chilean professional footballer who plays as a centre back for Chilean club Deportes Santa Cruz on loan from Universidad Católica.

Career

Universidad Catolica
Salomon debuted the year 2020 in the match against Everton in Estadio Sausalito, on the following date.

Career statistics

Club

Honours

Club
Universidad Católica

Primera División de Chile: 2020, 2021
 Supercopa de Chile: 2020, 2021

References

External links
 

2000 births
Living people
Chilean footballers
Chile youth international footballers
Association football forwards
Chilean Primera División players
Club Deportivo Universidad Católica footballers
People from Santiago Province, Chile